Lily Smith was a fictional character in Home and Away.

Lily Smith may also refer to:

Lily Casey Smith, character in Half Broke Horses
Lily Smith, character in 8 Mile
Lily Smith, on List of Privileged characters